María del Consuelo Rafaela Rodríguez de Alba (born 24 October 1959) is a Mexican politician affiliated with the Institutional Revolutionary Party. As of 2014 she served as Deputy of the LIX Legislature of the Mexican Congress as a plurinominal representative.

References

1959 births
Living people
People from Aguascalientes City
Women members of the Chamber of Deputies (Mexico)
Members of the Chamber of Deputies (Mexico)
Institutional Revolutionary Party politicians
Deputies of the LIX Legislature of Mexico